Stuart Daniel Lake is an American college baseball coach who is currently the Coordinator of Baseball Administration / Director of Player Development for South Carolina Gamecocks baseball. He was named the Big South Coach of the Year in 2011, when the Charleston Southern Buccaneers went 29–30 and tied for third place in the conference after finishing last in 2010.

Playing career
In the early 1990s, Lake played baseball at USC Salkehatchie and Newberry College but eventually graduated from Charleston Southern in 1994.

Coaching career

Assistant coaching
After graduating from Charleston Southern in 1994, Lake spent four years as a high school baseball coach.  His first collegiate coaching experience came in four seasons with South Carolina (1999–2002).  During his tenure, the Gamecocks appeared in three NCAA Tournaments and were national runners-up once.  Lake then spent one season at College of Charleston (2003), three at Ole Miss (2004–2006), and two at The Citadel (2007–2008).

Charleston Southern
Lake was hired to replace Jason Murray as Charleston Southern's head coach for the start of the 2009 season.  After finishing 7th and 10th in the Big South in his first two seasons, the Buccaneers tied for 3rd in 2011, earning Lake the Big South Coach of the Year award.  In 2014, Charleston Southern had its first winning season under Lake, going 30–26.

Head coaching record
Below is a table of Lake's yearly records as a collegiate head baseball coach.

See also
 Charleston Southern Buccaneers

References

Living people
Charleston Southern Buccaneers baseball players
High school baseball coaches in the United States
South Carolina Gamecocks baseball coaches
College of Charleston Cougars baseball coaches
Ole Miss Rebels baseball coaches
The Citadel Bulldogs baseball coaches
Charleston Southern Buccaneers baseball coaches
Charleston Southern University alumni
1971 births